The Intimilii or Intemelii were a Ligurian tribe dwelling on the Mediterranean coast, around present-day Ventimiglia, during the Iron Age and the Roman period.

Name 
They are mentioned as Intimilii by Caelius Rufus (49 BC), Intemelii by Livy (late 1st c. BC), and as Intemélioi (Ἰντεμέλιοι) by Strabo (early 1st c. AD).

The modern city of Ventimiglia, attested as oppidum Album Intimilium by Pliny (1st c. AD) and as Álbion Intemélion (Ἄλβιον Ἰντεμέλιον) by Strabo, is named after the Ligurian tribe.

The ethnic name Intimilii appears to be of Indo-European origin. Patrizia de Bernardo Stempel has proposed to interpret their chief town, Album Intimilium, as stemming from an earlier *Albion Vindi-mell-ion ('the white-hill town').

Geography 

The Intemelli dwelled on the Mediterranean coast, east of Mont Agel around the town of Album Intimilium (modern Ventimiglia). Their territory was located east of the Vediantii, west of the Ingauni, and south of the Epanterii.

Their chief town was known as Album (or Albium) Intimilium, and later as Albintimilium. Mentioned as an oppidum by Pliny and as a municipium by Tacitus, the settlement was devastated by the supporters of Otho in 69 AD.

History 
In 180 BC, the consul Aulus Postumius Albinus, after vanquishing the nearby mountain Ligurians, sent ships to reconnoiter the shores of the Intemelii and Ingauni, which suggests that they were regarded as a potentially hostile tribe by Rome at that time.

In March 49 BC, during the Civil War, Caelius Rufus reported to his friend Cicero that Demetrius, a garrison-commander from Pompey's army, had been bribed by one faction among the Intimilii to murder the local notable and former host of Caesar named Domitius. The people of Intimilium took the arms and Caelius was forced to come there with some cohorts through the snow to restore order.

References

Primary sources

Bibliography 

 

Ligures
Tribes conquered by Rome